The 2021 Columbus Challenger was a professional challenger level tennis tournament played on indoor hard courts. It was the tenth edition of the men's tournament which was part of the 2021 ATP Challenger Tour and the first edition of the women's event, that was part of 2021 WTA 125K series. It took place in Columbus, United States between 20 and 26 September 2021.

Champions

Men's singles

  Stefan Kozlov def.  Max Purcell 4–6, 6–2, 6–4.

Women's singles

  Nuria Párrizas Díaz def.  Wang Xinyu, 7–6(7–2), 6–3

Men's doubles

 Stefan Kozlov /  Peter Polansky def.  Andrew Lutschaunig /  James Trotter 7–5, 7–6(7–5).

Women's doubles

  Wang Xinyu /  Zheng Saisai def.  Dalila Jakupović /  Nuria Párrizas Díaz, 6–1, 6–1

ATP singles main draw entrants

Seeds

 1 Rankings are as of September 13, 2021.

Other entrants
The following players received entry into the singles main draw as wildcards:
  Cannon Kingsley
  James Tracy
  Matěj Vocel

The following players received entry into the singles main draw as alternates:
  Nick Chappell
  Dayne Kelly

The following players received entry into the singles main draw from the qualifying draw:
  Gijs Brouwer
  Chung Yun-seong
  Evan King
  Aleksandar Kovacevic

The following players received entry as lucky losers:
  Alexis Galarneau
  Shintaro Mochizuki

WTA singles main draw entrants

Seeds

 1 Rankings are as of September 13, 2021.

Other entrants
The following players received entry into the singles main draw as wildcards:
  Elsa Jacquemot
  Elvina Kalieva
  Katrina Scott
  Peyton Stearns

The following player was accepted directly into the main draw using a protected or a special ranking: 
  Liang En-shuo

The following players received entry into the singles main draw from the qualifying draw:
  Louisa Chirico
  Alexa Glatch
  Priscilla Hon
  Danielle Lao

The following player received entry into the singles main draw as a lucky loser:
  Dalila Jakupović

Withdrawals
Before the tournament
  Marie Bouzková → replaced by  Beatriz Haddad Maia
  Christina McHale → replaced by  Kurumi Nara
  Caty McNally → replaced by  Katie Volynets
  Grace Min → replaced by  Francesca Di Lorenzo
  Anna Kalinskaya → replaced by  Dalila Jakupović
  Kateryna Kozlova → replaced by  Hailey Baptiste
  Claire Liu → replaced by  Asia Muhammad
  Emma Raducanu → replaced by  Rebecca Marino
  Donna Vekić → replaced by  Jamie Loeb

WTA doubles main draw entrants

Seeds

 Rankings are as of September 13, 2021

Other entrants
The following pairs received wildcards into the doubles main draw: 
  Luna Dormet /  Lucía Marzal Martínez 
  Elsa Jacquemot /  Eleana Yu

References

External links
 Official website

ATP Columbus Challenger
Columbus Challenger
2021 in American tennis
2021 in sports in Ohio
September 2021 sports events in the United States